Deuben is a municipal subdivision of Freital in Sächsische Schweiz-Osterzgebirge district.

History 
The village was first mentioned in 1378. In the 1920s, Deuben was one of the biggest villages in Germany. At 1 October 1921, the villages Deuben, Döhlen and Potschappel merged to the new town Freital.

Residents 
 1834: 252
 1871: 4360
 1890: 6864
 1910: 11009

External links 
 Deuben in Historisches Ortsverzeichnis von Sachsen (German)

References 

Former municipalities in Saxony
Freital
Weißeritz